Mukhsha Ulus, or Naruchat Duchy (Murunza; , Naruchad Horde) was a subdivision of Golden Horde in Middle Mokshaland, modern Mordovia, Penza Oblast and Tambov Oblast of Russia in 13th-15th centuries with the capital in Mukhsha. Population was mainly Mokshas, Mişär Tatars, and  Burtas. In 1313–1367 years coined own money. Population was mostly agricultural. Some were cattle-breeders and craftsmen. The main territory of the ulus (district) was situated between rivers Sura and Tsna.

History
The territory of the Medieval Moksha kingdom Murunza was conquered by Batu Khan in 1237 In Latin sources mentioned as Moxel (Mokshaland). Russian Laurentian Codex mentions the name of the Moksha king, Puresh.

In 1313-1342 Mukhsha became the administrative center of Mukhsha Ulus and residence of Öz Beg Khan.
In 1395 it suffered the raid of Timur who destroyed the capital Mukhsha. In 1360 Tağay beg conquered the ulus. It became a semi-independent Naruchat duchy. In 1367 Mamai conquered that duchy. In the end of 14th century the duchy declined and in the beginning of 15th century Russians conquered it. Naruçat Duchy was a place where Mişär Tatars and Mişär dialect were formed.

Literature
Making Mongol History: Rashid al-Din and the Jamiʿ al-Tawarikh (Edinburgh Studies in Classical Islamic History and Culture) by Stefan Kamola, Edinburgh University Press; 1st edition (August 14, 2019), 
Лебедев В. И., Загадочный город Мохши, Пенза, 1958

References

External links
 The Golden Horde coinage
Кайрат Кайруллинович Закирьянов. Тюркская сага Чингисхана & КЗ-фактор: документальное исследование. 2013,

See also
Mokshaland
Mukhsha
Sernya battle
Narchat
Mishar Yurt
Temnikov Principality
Mishar Tatars
Burtas
Mongol invasion of Europe
History of Mokshaland
History of Middle Volga Area

History of the Mongol Empire
Mongol rump states
Golden Horde
Medieval Russia
Tatar states
History of Tatarstan
History of Mordovia
History of Penza Oblast
History of Tambov Oblast
Geography of Mordovia
Geography of Tambov Oblast
Geography of Penza Oblast
States and territories established in the 12th century